The German Music Authors' Prize is a German music prize that has been awarded since 2009 by German collective rights association GEMA. It is awarded to composers and lyricists for their outstanding achievements. Under the motto "Authors honor authors", the winners are chosen by an independent jury of composers, lyricists and producers from all genres. Amongst the ten categories awarded, only the Young Talents category comes with a monetary prize of 10,000 Euro.

Recipients

2009 
The ceremony took place on 28 May 2009 in Berlin, at the "axica" conference center.

 Composition Film music: Martin Böttcher
 Composition Pop/Rock: Peter Fox
 Lyrics Pop/Rock: Judith Holofernes
 Composition Independent: 
 Lyrics Hip-Hop: Die Fantastischen Vier
 Composition Music Theatre: Detlev Glanert
 Composition Symphonic: Manfred Trojahn
 Most Successful Work of the Year: Annette Humpe
 Young Talent Award: Kai-Uwe Kolkhorst
 Lifetime achievement: Peter Thomas

2010 
The ceremony took place on 22 April 2010 in Berlin, at the "axica" conference center.

 Composition Dance: Alex Christensen
 Lyrics Schlager: Joachim Horn-Bernges
 Composition Pop/Rock: David Jost, Dave Roth, Pat Benzner
 Lyrics Pop/Rock: Jan Delay
 Composition Jazz: Nils Wogram
 Composition Instrumental music: Rebecca Saunders
 Composition Experimental music: Carola Bauckholt
 Most Successful Work of the Year: Silbermond
 Young Talent Award: 
 Lifetime achievement: Michael Kunze

2011 

 Composition Instrumental music: York Höller
 Composition Opera/Song: Aribert Reimann
 Composition Film music: 
 Composition Pop: Annette Humpe, Adel Tawil, Sebastian Kirchner (Ich + Ich)
 Composition Rock: Klaus Meine, Rudolf Schenker, Matthias Jabs (Scorpions)
 Lyrics Singer-songwriter/song: Reinhard Mey
 Lyrics Schlager/Volkstümliche Musik: Jutta Staudenmayer
 Most Successful Work of the Year: ,  (Unheilig)
 Young Talent Award: 
 Lifetime achievement: Hans Werner Henze

2012 
The ceremony took place on 24 May 2012 in Berlin, at the Ritz-Carlton Hotel.

 Composition Film music: 
 Lyrics Children's song: 
 Composition Jazz: Tied & Tickled Trio (Markus Acher, Micha Acher)
 Composition Experimental music: Georg Katzer
 Composition Religious music: Dieter Schnebel
 Lyrics Pop: 
 Composition Rock:  (Catharina Sieland)
 Young Talent Award: Sarah Nemtsov
 Most Successful Work of the Year: Dieter Bohlen
 Lifetime achievement: James Last

2013 
The ceremony took place on 25 April 2013 in Berlin, at the Ritz-Carlton Hotel.

 Composition Rock/Pop: Die Toten Hosen
 Composition Film music: Annette Focks
 Lyrics Pop: 
 Lyrics Hip-Hop: Deichkind
 Composition Symphonic: Jörg Widmann
 Composition Art song: 
 Composition Dance/Elektro: Yann Peifer & Manuel Reuter
 Young Talent Award:  & Jan Miserre
 Most Successful Work of the Year: Die Toten Hosen – Tage wie diese
 Lifetime achievement: Klaus Huber

2014 
The ceremony took place on 8 May 2014 in Berlin, at the Ritz-Carlton Hotel.

 Composition Jazz: 
 Composition Film music: Martin Todsharow
 Composition Elektro: Robot Koch
 Composition Solo concert: Isabel Mundry
 Lyrics Vernacular: 
 Composition Contemporary choir music: Charlotte Seither
 Lyrics Pop/Rock: Bosse
 Young Talent Award: Marko Nikodijević
 Most Successful Work of the Year: Sportfreunde Stiller – Applaus, Applaus
 Lifetime achievement: Udo Jürgens

2015 
The ceremony took place on 21 May 2015 in Berlin, at the Ritz-Carlton Hotel.

 Composition Pop: Tobias Kuhn
 Composition Hip-Hop: Farhot
 Composition Music Theatre: Helmut Oehring
 Composition Orchestra: Adriana Hölszky
 Composition Audiovisual media: 
 Lyrics Pop/Rock: Wolfgang Niedecken
 Lyrics Schlager: 
 Young Talent Award:  (Eleni Zafiriadou)
 Most Successful Work of the Year: Mark Forster, Sido, Daniel Nitt und Philipp Steinke – Au revoir
 Lifetime achievement: Helmut Lachenmann

2016 
The ceremony took place on 12 May 2016 in Berlin, at the Ritz-Carlton Hotel.

 Composition Pop/Rock: Sonja Glass
 Composition Jazz/Crossover: Tini Thomsen
 Lyrics Hip-Hop: Marten Laciny (Marteria/Marsimoto)
 Composition Ensemble Music: Enno Poppe
 Composition Music with voice: 
 Composition Audiovisual media: 
 Lyrics Singer-songwriter: Sven Regener (Element of Crime)
 Young Talent award: Jagoda Szmytka
 Most Successful Work of the Year: Andreas Bourani, Marek Pompetzki, Paul Würdig – Astronaut
 Lifetime achievement: Martin Böttcher

2017 
 Composition Audiovisual media:  & 
 Composition Hip-Hop: 
 Composition Musik Für Musiktheater: Anno Schreier
 Composition Rock/Pop: Wallis Bird
 Composition Symphonic: Olga Neuwirth
 Text Schlager: 
 Text Musikkabarett: 
 Most Successful Work of the Year: Kerstin Ott
 Young Talent award: Von Wegen Lisbeth
 Lifetime achievement: Sofia Gubaidulina

2018 
 Composition Audiovisual media: 
 Composition Dance/Elektro: Martin Stimming
 Composition Voice Experiment: David Moss
 Composition Rock/Metal: Rammstein
 Composition Solo concert: 
 Text Hip-Hop:  (Friedrich Kautz)
 Text Pop: 
 Young Talent award: , Kathrin A. Denner and 
 Most Successful Work of the Year: Alice Merton and Nicolas Rebscher
 Lifetime achievement: Klaus Doldinger

2019 
 Composition Audiovisual media: 
 Composition Choir music: Arvo Pärt
 Composition Ensemble with electronic: 
 Composition Hip Hop: Christian Kalla (Crada)
 Composition Jazz/Crossover: Martin Tingvall
 Text Kinderlied: Suli Puschban
 Text Pop/Rock: Maxim Richarz
 Young Talent award: Elif Demirezer and Mark Barden
 Most Successful Work of the Year: Namika, Simon Triebel,  (around Hannes Büscher, David Vogt, Philip Böllhoff and Sipho Sililo), Simon Müller-Lerch and Alpha Diallo (Black M)
 Lifetime achievement: Wolfgang Rihm

External links

References 

Songwriting awards
German music awards
Music in Berlin
Awards established in 2009
2009 establishments in Germany